The 1999–2000 Czech 2. Liga was the seventh season of the 2. česká fotbalová liga, the second tier of the Czech football league. Eventual winners, FC Synot clinched promotion to the Czech First League five matches before the end of the season.

League standings

Top goalscorers

See also 
 1999–2000 Czech First League
 1999–2000 Czech Cup

References

External links 
  
 RSSSF

Czech 2. Liga seasons
Czech
2